NATO reporting name for SA series surface-to-air missiles, with Soviet designations:

 SA-1 "Guild" (S-25 Berkut)
 SA-2 "Guideline" (S-75 Dvina/Volkhov/Desna)
 SA-3 "Goa" (S-125 Nyeva)
 SA-4 "Ganef" (9M8 Krug)
 SA-5 "Gammon" (S-200 Volga)
 SA-6 "Gainful" (2K12 Kub/Kvadrat)
 SA-7 "Galosh" and "Grail" (9K32 Strela-2)
 SA-8 "Gecko" (9K33 Osa)
 SA-9 "Gaskin" (9K31 Strela-1)
 SA-10 "Grumble"  (S-300P/PS/PT)
 SA-11 "Gadfly" (9K37 Buk)
 SA-12 "Gladiator/Giant" (S-300V)
 SA-13 "Gopher" (9K35 Strela-10)
 SA-14 "Gremlin" (9K36 Strela-3)
 SA-15 "Gauntlet" (9K330/9K331/9K332 Tor)
 SA-16 "Gimlet" (9K310 Igla-1)
 SA-17 "Grizzly" (9K37 Buk-M1-2)
 SA-18 "Grouse" (9K38 Igla)
 SA-19 "Grison" (2K22 Tunguska)
 SA-20 "Gargoyle" (S-300PM/PMU Favorit)
 SA-21 "Growler"  (S-400 Triumf)
 SA-22 "Greyhound" (Pantsir-S1)
 SA-23 "Gladiator/Giant" (S-300VM "Antey-2500")
 SA-24 "Grinch" (9K338 Igla-S)
 SA-X-25 "9M337 Sosna-R"
 SA-26 "Pechora-2M"
 SA-27 Gollum "Buk missile system" (Buk-M3)
 SA-X-28 "S-350E Vityaz 50R6"
 SA-29 VERBA 9M336 "9K333 Verba" (9K333 Verba "Willow")

U.S. DoD designations for SA-N series naval surface-to-air missiles, with Soviet designations. Note that these are not standard NATO names, NATO uses the regular SA series for naval SAMS also, however the US DoD refers to them by these names:

 SA-N-1 Goa (4К90 Volna) [SA-3]
 SA-N-2 Guideline (М-2 Volkhov-M) [SA-2]
 SA-N-3 Goblet (4K60/4K65 Shtorm)
 SA-N-4 Gecko (9M33 Osa-M) [SA-8]
 SA-N-5 Grail (9K32 Strela-2) [SA-7]
 SA-N-6 Grumble  (S-300F Fort) [SA-10]
 SA-N-7 Gadfly (9M38/9M38M Uragan) [SA-11]
 SA-N-8 Gremlin" (9K34 Strela-3) [SA-14]
 SA-N-9 Gauntlet (3K95 Kinzhal) [SA-15]
 SA-N-10 Grouse (3M38 Igla) [SA-18]
 SA-N-11 Grison (3M87 Kashtan) [SA-19]
 SA-N-12 Grizzly (3K37 Smerch/Shtil) [SA-17]
 SA-N-14 Grouse (9K38 Igla) [SA-18]
 SA-N-20 Gargoyle (S-300FM) [SA-20]

References

See also
NATO reporting name

surface-to-air missiles